This University of Wisconsin–Madison people in academics consists of notable people who graduated or attended the University of Wisconsin–Madison.

Soedradjad Djiwandono, Professor of International Economics, Nanyang Technological University
Julia Adams (sociologist), Professor, Yale University
Robert Adair, Professor Emeritus of Physics, Yale University
David Adamany, former President of Temple University
Colin Adams, Professor of Mathematics, Williams College
Paul C. Adams, Associate Professor of Geography, University of Texas-Austin
Julius Adler
Madeleine Wing Adler, former President, West Chester University
Sarita Adve, Professor of Computer Science, University of Illinois, Urbana-Champaign
Michael A'Hearn, astronomer
Julie Ahringer, Senior Research Fellow, Gurdon Institute, Cambridge University
Anastasia Ailamaki, Professor of Computer Science, École Polytechnique Fédérale de Lausanne
Fay Ajzenberg-Selove, Professor Emerita of Physics, University of Pennsylvania; taught at Haverford College
Robert A. Alberty, Professor Emeritus of Chemistry, MIT
F. King Alexander, President of California State University, Long Beach
Gar Alperovitz, author, economist, historian, and former fellow at Cambridge University
Sanford Soverhill Atwood - scientist, Provost of Cornell University, President of Emory University
Alice Ambrose, former Professor of Philosophy, Smith College
Stephen E. Ambrose, author and historian
Marc A. Anderson, environmental chemist
Arthur Irving Andrews, former Professor of Diplomacy, Charles University in Prague
Thomas G. Andrews, historian
Nancy Armstrong, Professor of English, Duke University
Marilyn Arnold, Professor Emeritus of English, Brigham Young University
Richard Arratia, Professor of Mathematics, University of Southern California
Michael Aschbacher, Professor of Mathematics, California Institute of Technology
Peter J. Aschenbrenner, historian, Purdue University 
David Audretsch, Professor of Economics, Indiana University
Nina Auerbach, Professor of Comparative Literature, University of Pennsylvania
John D. Axtell, former Professor of Agronomy, Purdue University
Oliver Edwin Baker, geographer
Tania A. Baker, Professor of Biochemistry, MIT
Ira Baldwin, bacteriologist
Clinton Ballou, Professor Emeritus of Biochemistry, University of California, Berkeley
David P. Barash, Professor of Psychology, University of Washington
Thomas P.M. Barnett, military and security strategist, former professor at the Naval War College
Michael Barnsley, Professor of Mathematics, Australian National University
Henry H. Barschall, physicist
Florence Bascom, geologist at Bryn Mawr College
Carolyn Baylies, former Reader in Sociology, University of Leeds
Charles L. Beach, President of the University of Connecticut
Jesse Beams, former Professor of Physics, University of Virginia
Carl L. Becker, former Professor of History, Cornell University
David T. Beito, author and historian
Richard Bellman, mathematician and inventor of dynamic programming
Frank Bencriscutto, former Professor of Music, University of Minnesota
Ernst Benda, former Professor of Law, University of Freiburg
William H. Bennett, Professor of Agronomy, Utah State University
Ira Berlin, Distinguished University Professor, University of Maryland
Bruce C. Berndt, Professor of Mathematics, University of Illinois, Urbana-Champaign
William T. Bielby, former Professor of Sociology, University of Pennsylvania
Ray Allen Billington, former Professor of History, Oxford University and Northwestern University
Thomas Binford, Professor Emeritus of Computer Science, Stanford University
Robert Byron Bird, chemical engineer
Kenneth O. Bjork, former Professor of History, Saint Olaf College
David W. Blight, Professor of History, Yale University; taught at Amherst College
Leonard Bloomfield, former Professor of Linguistics, Yale University
Herbert Eugene Bolton, professor of history at the University of Texas at Austin and University of California, Berkeley
George Boyer, Professor of Economics, Cornell University
Carol Breckenridge, anthropologist
Patricia Flatley Brennan, Professor of Engineering
Arthur Louis Breslich, President of German Wallace College and Baldwin-Wallace College
Ernest J. Briskey, Dean of Agricultural Science, Oregon State University
David H. Bromwich, Professor of Geography, Ohio State University
Morton Brown, Professor Emeritus of Mathematics, University of Michigan
Norman O. Brown, scholar of Classics
Christopher Browning, Professor of History, University of North Carolina, Chapel Hill
Robert X. Browning, Associate Professor of Political Science, Purdue University
Mari Jo Buhle, Professor Emerita of History, Brown University
Paul Buhle, activist and lecturer, Brown University
R. Carlyle Buley, former Professor of History, Indiana University
Mary Bunting, former President, Radcliffe College
Robert H. Burris, biochemist
Frederick H. Buttel, former Professor of Sociology
Lester J. Cappon, historian, documentary editor, and archivist for Colonial Williamsburg
Claudia Card, Emma Goldman (WARF) Professor of Philosophy at the University of Wisconsin–Madison
Margery C. Carlson (M.S. 1920, Ph.D. 1925), Professor of Botany, Northwestern University
John Casida, Professor of Entomology, University of California, Berkeley
Carlos Castillo-Chavez, Professor of Mathematical Biology, Arizona State University
Edward Castronova, Professor of Telecommunications, Indiana University
Kwang-Chu Chao, chemical engineer at Purdue University
Arthur B. Chapman, geneticist
Peter Charanis, former Professor of History, Rutgers University
Vivek Chibber, sociologist, New York University
Edith Clarke, former Professor of Electrical Engineering, University of Texas-Austin
W. Wallace Cleland, biochemist
John H. Coatsworth, Provost, Columbia University
Alan Code, Professor of Philosophy, Stanford University 
Stephen P. Cohen, Senior Fellow, Brookings Institution
Betsy Colquitt, Professor of Literature and Creative Writing, Texas Christian University
Timothy E. Cook, former Professor of Political Science at Williams College and Louisiana State University
Vincent Cooke, S.J., (Ph.D. philosophy 1971), academic administrator, President of Canisius College (1993–2010)
Arthur C. Cope,  former Professor of Chemistry, MIT
Brian Coppola, Professor of Chemistry, University of Michigan
Giovanni Costigan, former Professor of History, University of Washington
May Louise Cowles, home economics instructor and lecturer
Richard H. Cracroft, Professor of English, Brigham Young University
Joanne V. Creighton, Interim President, Haverford College; former President, Mount Holyoke College
Kimberlé Crenshaw, Professor of Law at Columbia University and UCLA
Tim Cresswell, Professor of Geography, University of London
William Cronon (1976), environmental historian
Harold Marion Crothers, Professor of Electrical Engineering, South Dakota State University
Chicita F. Culberson, Senior Research Scientist in Biology, Duke University
Chris Cuomo, former Professor of Ethics, University of Cincinnati
Richard N. Current, historian
John T. Curtis, botanist
Edward Cussler, Professor of Chemical Engineering, University of Minnesota
Thomas Daniel, Professor of Biology, University of Washington
Stephen Daniels, Professor of Cultural Geography, University of Nottingham
Richard Danner, Professor of Law, Duke University
Kelvin Davies, Professor of Gerontology, University of Southern California
W. R. Davies, President (1941–1959), University of Wisconsin–Eau Claire
James A. Davis, sociologist
Kenneth S. Davis, historian
Dick de Jongh, Professor Emeritus of Logic and Mathematics, University of Amsterdam
Brady J. Deaton, Chancellor, University of Missouri
Peter Dervan, Professor of Chemistry, California Institute of Technology
Matthew Desmond, Professor of Sociology, Princeton University
Frans Dieleman, former Professor of Geography, Utrecht University
John Louis DiGaetani, Professor of English, Hofstra University
Hasia Diner, historian
Robert Disque, President, Drexel Institute of Technology
Carl Djerassi, Professor of Chemistry, Stanford University
John Dollard, former Professor of Psychology, Yale University
J. Kevin Dorsey, Dean, Southern Illinois University School of Medicine
Eliza T. Dresang (PhD, 1981), professor and researcher in literacy, library and information sciences, media and technology
Lee A. DuBridge, former President, California Institute of Technology
Wendell E. Dunn, President of the Middle States Association of Colleges and Schools
Nancy Dye, former President, Oberlin College
William G. Dyer, Dean, Marriott School of Management at Brigham Young University
Anne Haas Dyson 1972 College of Education - professor and researcher in literacy
Olin J. Eggen, astronomer
Marc Egnal, Professor of History, York University
Jean Bethke Elshtain, Professor of Divinity and Philosophy, University of Chicago
Conrad Elvehjem, former President, University of Wisconsin-Madison
Michael Engh, President of Santa Clara University
David Estlund, Lombardo Family Professor of the Humanities, Brown University
John Eyler, Professor Emeritus of History, University of Minnesota
John K. Fairbank, former Professor of History, Harvard University
Etta Zuber Falconer, Professor of Mathematics, Norfolk State University and Spelman College
Joseph Felsenstein, Professor of Biology, University of Washington
Peter Edgerly Firchow, Professor Emeritus of English, University of Minnesota
Erica Flapan, Professor of Mathematics, Pomona College
Robben Wright Fleming, former President, University of Michigan
Neil Fligstein, Professor of Sociology, University of California, Berkeley
George T. Flom, former Professor of Scandinavian Languages, University of Illinois, Urbana-Champaign
Karl Folkers, biochemist
Michael J. Franklin, Professor of Computer Science, University of California, Berkeley
Shane Frederick, Associate Professor of Management, Yale University
Daniel Z. Freedman, Professor of Physics, MIT
Joseph S. Freedman, Professor of Education at Alabama State University
Frank Freidel, former Professor of History at Harvard University and the University of Washington
Linda P. Fried, Dean of Public Health, Columbia University
Joseph G. Fucilla, former Professor of Romantic Languages, Northwestern University
D.R. Fulkerson, former Professor of Mathematics, Cornell University
Ellen V. Futter, former President of Barnard College
William A. Gahl, geneticist, NIH
John Gallagher III, astronomer
Fernando García Roel, Rector, Monterrey Institute of Technology and Higher Education
Lloyd Gardner, historian of U.S. foreign relations
Johannes Gehrke, Professor of Computer Science, Cornell University
Judy Genshaft, President of University of South Florida
Mark Gertler, Professor of Economics, New York University
Paul Gertler, Professor of Economics and Business, University of California, Berkeley
Arnold Gesell, former Professor of Psychology, Yale University
Reza Ghadiri, Professor of Chemistry, Scripps Research Institute
Jacquelyn Gill, Assistant professor of climate science, University of Maine
Donna Ginther, Professor of Economics, University of Kansas
G. N. Glasoe, former Professor of Physics, Columbia University; Associate Director, Brookhaven National Laboratory
George Glauberman, Professor of Mathematics, University of Chicago
Helen Iglauer Glueck, Director of the Coagulation Laboratory, University of Cincinnati
Harvey Goldberg, activist and historian
Gerson Goldhaber, Professor Emeritus of Physics, University of California, Berkeley; researcher, Lawrence Berkeley National Laboratory
Brison D. Gooch, historian
Ann Dexter Gordon, historian, editor of The Elizabeth Cady Stanton and Susan B. Anthony Papers Project at Rutgers University
Myron J. Gordon, Professor Emeritus of Finance, University of Toronto
Richard K. Green, Professor of Business, University of Southern California
William Greene, Professor of Economics, New York University
Michael Gribskov, Professor of Biological Sciences, Purdue University
Paul J. Griffiths, Professor of Theology, Duke University
Erik Gronseth, former Professor of Sociology, University of Oslo
David L. Gross, Professor of History at University of Colorado at Boulder
James A. Gross, labor historian at Cornell University
Jennifer Guglielmo, Associate Professor of History and Women's Studies, Smith College
Ernst Guillemin, electrical engineer and computer scientist, MIT, recipient of the IEEE Medal of Honor
Ramón A. Gutiérrez, Professor of History, University of Chicago
Herbert Gutman, Professor of History, City University of New York
Jeffrey K. Hadden, former Professor of Sociology, University of Virginia
Usha Haley, former Professor of International Business, University of New Haven
Joseph M. Hall, Jr., Professor of American History, Bates College
Helena Hamerow, Professor of Medieval Archaeology, Oxford University
Gordon Hammes, Professor Emeritus of Biochemistry, Duke University
Jo Handelsman, Professor of Biology and Medicine, Yale University
Pat Hanrahan, Professor of Computer Science and Electrical Engineering, Stanford University
Alvin Hansen, former Professor of Economics, Harvard University; Presidential advisor
John W. Harbaugh, Professor of Geological and Environmental Sciences, Stanford University
Cole Harris, geographer; professor at the University of Toronto
Daniel Hartl, Professor of Biology, Harvard University
Arthur D. Hasler, ecologist and zoologist
Darren Hawkins, Professor of Political Science, Brigham Young University
James Edwin Hawley, Professor of Mineralogy, Queen's University; namesake of Hawleyite
Patrick J. Hearden, Professor of History, Purdue University
Margaret Hedstrom, Professor of Information, University of Michigan
D. Mark Hegsted, former Professor of Nutrition at Harvard University
Walter Heller, former Professor of Economics, University of Minnesota; Chair, Council of Economic Advisors
Joseph M. Hellerstein, Professor of Computer Science, University of California, Berkeley
Frederick Hemke, Professor of Saxophone, Bienen School of Music at Northwestern University
Ralph D. Hetzel, former President, Pennsylvania State University
Howard Hibbard, former Professor of Italian Baroque Art, Columbia University
Elfrieda "Freddy" Hiebert, literacy advocate
Thomas Hines, Professor Emeritus, UCLA
Ralph Hirschmann, former Professor of Chemistry, University of Pennsylvania
Ho Ping-sung, former historian at Peking University and Beijing Normal University
Michael A. Hoffman, Professor of Earth Sciences and Resources, University of South Carolina
LaVahn Hoh, Professor of Drama, University of Virginia
Karen Holbrook, former President, Ohio State University
Charles H. Holbrow, physicist, Charles A. Dana Professor of physics, emeritus, Colgate University
Lori L. Holt, Associate Professor of Psychology, Carnegie Mellon University
Olga Holtz, Associate Professor of Mathematics, University of California, Berkeley; Professor of Applied Mathematics, Technical University Berlin
Renate Holub, philosopher and interdisciplinary theorist, University of California, Berkeley
Robert C. Holub, current chancellor of the University of Massachusetts Amherst (2008–present)
Vasant Honavar,  Professor in Biomedical Data Sciences and Artificial Intelligence, Pennsylvania State University
Earnest Hooton, former Professor of Anthropology, Harvard University
Calvin B. Hoover, former Professor of Economics, Duke University
William O. Hotchkiss, President of Michigan Technological University and Rensselaer Polytechnic Institute
Mark Huddleston, President, University of New Hampshire
Clark L. Hull, psychologist of motivation at Yale University
William Hunter, statistician
William Edwards Huntington, President of Boston University
Lloyd Hustvedt, former Professor of Norwegian, Saint Olaf College
Jacquelyne Jackson, sociologist and academic
William Jaco, Professor of Mathematics, Oklahoma State University-Stillwater
Russell Jacoby, Professor of History, UCLA
James Alton James, former Professor of History, Northwestern University
Henry Jenkins, Professor of Communication Arts, University of Southern California
Merrill Jensen, historian
Carleton B. Joeckel, former librarian
Peter Johnsen, Vice President for Academic Affairs, Bradley University
Emory Richard Johnson, former Dean of Business, University of Pennsylvania
Michael D. Johnson, Dean of Hotel Administration, Cornell University
Charles O. Jones, former Professor of Political Science, University of Wisconsin-Madison and University of Virginia and former President, American Political Science Association
Jacqueline Jones, Professor of History, University of Texas-Austin
Kenneth Judd, Senior Fellow, Hoover Institution
Ellsworth Kalas, President of Asbury Theological Seminary
Vytautas Kavolis, sociologist
Homayoon Kazerooni, Professor of Mechanical Engineering, University of California, Berkeley
Edmond Keller, Professor of Political Science, UCLA
George L. Kelling, Professor of Social Welfare, Rutgers University
Ben Kerkvliet, Professor of Political Science, Australian National University
Corey Keyes, sociologist at Emory University
Margaret Keyes, former Professor of Home Economics, University of Iowa
Spencer L. Kimball, former Dean of Law, University of Wisconsin-Madison; former Professor of Law, University of Chicago and University of Michigan
Robin Wall Kimmerer, Professor of Environmental of Forest Biology, State University of New York College of Environmental Science and Forestry
Gary King, Professor of Government, Harvard University; taught at New York University and Oxford University
Nicole King, Assistant Professor of Genetics, Genomics, and Development; University of California, Berkeley
Ronold W. P. King, former Professor of Physics, Harvard University
Willford I. King, former Professor of Economics, New York University
John W. Kingdon, Professor Emeritus of Political Science, University of Michigan
David Kinley, former President, University of Illinois, Urbana-Champaign
Grayson L. Kirk, former President, Columbia University
Charles Kittel, former Professor of Physics, University of California, Berkeley
Anne C. Klein, Professor of Religious Studies, Rice University
William J. Klish, Professor of Pediatrics, Gastroenterology, Hepatology, and Nutrition; Baylor College of Medicine
J. Martin Klotsche, first chancellor of the University of Wisconsin–Milwaukee
Clyde Kluckhohn, former Professor of Anthropology, Harvard University
Anne Kelly Knowles, Professor of Geography, Middlebury College
Kenneth Koedinger, Professor of Psychology, Carnegie Mellon University
Henry Koffler, former Vice President, University of Minnesota
Gabriel Kolko, historian
Arnold Krammer, historian, retired from Texas A&M University 
Thomas R. Kratochwill, psychologist
Konrad Bates Krauskopf, former Professor of Geology, Stanford University
James E. Krier, Professor of Law, University of Michigan; taught at Harvard University, Oxford University, Stanford University, and UCLA
Leo Kristjanson, President, University of Saskatchewan
Lawrence Kritzman, Professor of French, Dartmouth College
Anne O. Krueger, Professor of Economics, Johns Hopkins University; taught at Stanford University
Harold J. Kushner, Professor Emeritus of Applied Mathematics, Brown University
Philip Kutzko, Professor of Mathematics, University of Iowa
Walter LaFeber, historian of U.S. foreign relations at Cornell University
Max G. Lagally, engineer and professor
James A. Lake, Professor of Biology and Genetics, UCLA
Janja Lalich, Professor of Sociology, California State University, Chico
Henry A. Lardy, biochemist
Edward Larson, winner of the Pulitzer Prize in history
Mark Lautens, Professor of Chemistry, University of Toronto
Traugott Lawler, Professor of English, Yale University
Michael Ledeen, security strategist at American Enterprise Institute and Foundation for Defense of Democracies
Winfred P. Lehmann, former Professor of German, University of Texas-Austin
Charles Kenneth Leith, geologist
John Leonora, Professor of Physiology and Pharmacology, Loma Linda University
A. Carl Leopold, Graduate Dean, University of Nebraska-Lincoln
A. Starker Leopold, son of Aldo Leopold; former Professor of Zoology at the University of California, Berkeley
Luna Leopold, son of Aldo Leopold; former Professor of Geology, University of California, Berkeley
Herb Levi, former Professor of Biology, Harvard University
Robert Lieber, Professor, Department of Government and School of Foreign Service, Georgetown University
Gene Likens, ecologist
Mary Ann Lila, former Professor of Nutrition, University of Illinois, Urbana-Champaign
Bernard J. Liska, food scientist at Purdue University
Timothy P. Lodge, Professor of Chemistry, University of Minnesota
Timothy M. Lohman, Professor of Medicine, Washington University School of Medicine at Washington University in St. Louis
Roberto Sabatino Lopez, former Professor of History at Yale University
Max O. Lorenz, economist and statistician
Daryl B. Lund, former Dean of Agricultural and Life Sciences, Cornell University
George A. Lundberg, sociologist at the University of Washington
Karl Mahlburg, mathematician
Tak Wah Mak, Professor of Biophysics and Immunology, University of Toronto
Howard Malmstadt, Professor Emeritus of Chemistry, University of Illinois, Urbana-Champaign
Daniel R. Mandelker, Professor of Law, Washington University School of Law at Washington University in St. Louis
James G. March, Professor Emeritus of Psychology, Stanford University
Carolyn "Biddy" Martin, President, Amherst College
Abraham Maslow (PhD 1934), groundbreaking humanist psychologist, "hierarchy of needs;" former professor at Brandeis University
Max Mason, former President, University of Chicago
Thomas Mathiesen, Professor Emeritus of Sociology, University of Oslo
Lola J. May, mathematics educator
Thomas J. McCormick, scholar of international relations
Thomas K. McCraw, Professor Emeritus of Business, Harvard University
Frederick Merk, former Professor of Government and History, Harvard University
Alan G. Merten, President of George Mason University
Gerald Meyer, Professor of Chemistry, Johns Hopkins University
James Henry Meyer, Chancellor of the University of California, Davis from 1969-1987
Joseph C. Miller, Professor of History, University of Virginia
Renée J. Miller, Professor of Computer Science, University of Toronto
C. Wright Mills, sociologist and professor at Columbia University
Lawrence Mishel, President, Economic Policy Institute
Olivia S. Mitchell, Professor of Economics, University of Pennsylvania
Jason Mittell, Professor of American Studies and Film, Middlebury College
Pornchai Mongkhonvanit, President of Siam University, President Emeritus of International Association of University Presidents
Florence M. Montgomery, art historian
Stephen S. Morse, Professor of Epidemiology, Columbia University
Clark A. Murdock, Senior Adviser, Center for Strategic and International Studies
John E. Murdoch, former historian and philosopher of science, Harvard University
John Murray, Jr., Chancellor and Professor of Law, Duquesne University
Daniel J. Myers, Professor of Sociology, University of Notre Dame
Mark Myers, geologist
Jeffrey Naughton, computer scientist
Richard Nelson, cultural anthropologist
Maurice F. Neufeld, professor emeritus, Cornell University
David Newbury, Professor of African Studies, Smith College
Barbara W. Newell, former President, Wellesley College
Carl Niemann, former Professor of Biochemistry, California Institute of Technology
David W. Noble, Professor of American Studies, University of Minnesota
Mark Nordenberg, Chancellor, University of Pittsburgh
Olaf M. Norlie, former Dean, Hartwick College
Gerald North, climatologist
Russel B. Nye, former Professor of English, Michigan State University
Alton Ochsner, UW medical professor and cancer researcher; co-founded the Ochsner Clinic in New Orleans
Emiko Ohnuki-Tierney, anthropologist
Bertell Ollman, Professor of Politics, New York University
Scott E. Page, Professor of Economics, University of Michigan
Thomas Palaima, Professor of Classics, University of Texas-Austin
Ann C. Palmenberg, biochemist
Dr. Tim Palmer, Professor of French and Japanese film studies at the University of North Carolina Wilmington.
Bernhard Palsson, Professor of Bioengineering, University of California, San Diego
John Parascandola, medical historian
Gil-Sung Park, Korean sociologist
W. Robert Parks, former President, Iowa State University
Michael Quinn Patton, former Professor of Sociology, University of Minnesota
Rhea Paul, Founding Chair of Department of Communication Disorders at Sacred Heart University
John Allen Paulos, Professor of Mathematics, Temple University; author of books about the consequences of mathematical illiteracy
John Vernon Pavlik, Professor of Journalism, Rutgers University
Donald E. Pearson, former Professor of Chemistry, Vanderbilt University
Joseph A. Pechman, former Senior Fellow, Brookings Institution; former President, American Economic Association
John Pemberton, Associate Professor of Anthropology, Columbia University
Selig Perlman, economist and labor historian
August Herman Pfund, former Professor of Physics, Johns Hopkins University
Anna Augusta Von Helmholtz-Phelan, Assistant Professor Emeritus of English, University of Minnesota
Andrew C. Porter, former president, AERA; former professor, Vanderbilt University; Dean of Education, University of Pennsylvania 
Alejandro Portes, Professor of Sociology, Princeton University
Philip S Portoghese, Professor of Medicinal Chemistry, University of Minnesota
Catherine Prendergast, Professor of English at University of Illinois Urbana-Champaign
L. Fletcher Prouty, former Professor of Air Force Science and Tactics, Yale University
Benjamin Arthur Quarles, historian
Matthew Rabin, Professor of Economics, University of California, Berkeley
Marian Radke-Yarrow, psychologist, National Institute of Mental Health
Ronald Radosh, activist and historian
Douglas W. Rae, Professor of Political Science, Yale University; author of Equalities
Jim Ranchino, late Professor of Political Science, Ouachita Baptist University
John Rapp, Professor of Political Science, Beloit College
George Rawick, historian
Joan Redwing, Professor of Materials Science and Engineering and Electrical Engineering, Pennsylvania State University
Robert A. Rees, former Professor of English, UCLA
Thomas Reh, Professor of Biology, University of Washington
J. Wayne Reitz, Professor of Agricultural Economics; fifth President of the University of Florida (1955-1967)
Frank J. Remington, former Professor of Law, University of Wisconsin-Madison
Justin Rhodes, Professor of Psychology, University of Illinois, Urbana-Champaign
Lori Ringhand, Professor of Law,  University of Georgia School of Law at University of Georgia
Walter Ristow, librarian
Temario Rivera, Professor of Political Science, International Christian University
Anita Roberts, former biochemist, National Cancer Institute
Arthur H. Robinson, geographer
Stuart Rojstaczer, former Professor of Geophysics, Duke University
Gerhard Krohn Rollefson, former Professor of Chemistry, University of California, Berkeley
Ediberto Roman, Professor of Law, Florida International University College of Law and Florida International University
Jia Rongqing, Professor of Mathematics, University of Alberta
Charles E. Rosenberg, historian of science at Harvard University
Milton J. Rosenberg, Professor Emeritus of Psychology, University of Chicago
Nathan Rosenberg, Professor Emeritus of Economics, Stanford University; taught at Cambridge University
George C. Royal, microbiologist
Lee Albert Rubel, former Professor of Mathematics, University of Illinois, Urbana-Champaign
David S. Ruder, former Dean of Law, Northwestern University
Mary P. Ryan, Professor of History, Johns Hopkins University and Professor Emerita of History, University of California, Berkeley
Joseph F. Rychlak, Professor of Humanistic Psychology, Loyola University Chicago
Herbert J. Ryser, former Professor of Mathematics, California Institute of Technology and Ohio State University
Yuriko Saito, Professor of Philosophy, Rhode Island School of Design
Theodore Saloutos, former Professor of History, UCLA
Warren Samuels, economist
Austin Sarat, Professor of Political Science, Amherst College
Richard J. Saykally, Professor of Chemistry, University of California, Berkeley
George Schaller, biologist and conservationist
Richard Scheller, former Professor of Biochemistry, Stanford University
Steven Schier, Professor of Political Science, Carleton College
Bernadotte Everly Schmitt, former President, American Historical Association; former Professor of History, University of Chicago
Mark Schorer, former Professor of English, University of California, Berkeley
Joan Wallach Scott, Professor of History, Institute for Advanced Study
Michael L. Scott, Professor of Computer Science, University of Rochester
John Searle, Professor of Philosophy, University of California, Berkeley
Robert Serber, former Professor of Physics, Columbia University; scientist on the Manhattan Project
Jim G. Shaffer, Professor of Anthropology, Case Western Reserve University
Cosma Shalizi, Assistant Professor of Statistics, Carnegie Mellon University
Steven Shapin, historian of science, Harvard University
Ira Sharkansky, Professor Emeritus of Political Science, Hebrew University of Jerusalem
Lauriston Sharp, former Professor of Anthropology, Cornell University
Spencer Shaw, former Professor of Library Science, University of Washington
Jerome Lee Shneidman, former Professor of History at Adelphi University, specialist in psychohistory
Victor Shoup, Professor of Mathematics, New York University
Mona L. Siegel - Professor of History, California State University, Sacramento
Daniel L. Simmons, Professor of Chemistry and Director of the Cancer Research Center, Brigham Young University
Brooks D. Simpson, Professor of History, Arizona State University
Louis B. Slichter, former Professor of Geophysics, MIT and UCLA
Sumner Slichter, former Professor of Economics, Harvard University
Ronald Smelser, former Professor of History (University of Utah), Holocaust educator and author of The Myth of the Eastern Front
William Cunningham Smith, literature scholar
David R. Soll, Professor of Biology, University of Iowa
Robert Soucy, Professor Emeritus of History, Oberlin College
Roy Spencer, Principal Research Scientist, University of Alabama in Huntsville
Clint Sprott, physicist
Janet Staiger, Professor of Communication, University of Texas-Austin
George Stambolian, former Professor of French, Wellesley College
Kenneth M. Stampp, former Professor of History, University of California, Berkeley; taught at Harvard University, Oxford University, University of London, and University of Munich
Leon C. Standifer, Professor of Horticulture, Louisiana State University
Michael Starbird, Professor of Mathematics, University of Texas-Austin
Stephen C. Stearns, Professor of Biology, Yale University
Harry Steenbock, biochemist and Vitamin D researcher
George Steinmetz (academic), Professor of Sociology, University of Michigan
Christopher H. Sterling, Professor of Media and Public Affairs, George Washington University
C. Eugene Steuerle, Institute Fellow, Urban Institute
Robert Stickgold, Associate Professor of Psychiatry, Harvard University
Philip Stieg, Professor and Chairman of Neurosurgery and Weill Medical College and New York-Presbyterian Medical Center
Gilbert Stork, Professor Emeritus of Chemistry at Columbia University
Murray A. Straus, Sociologist and professor University of New Hampshire, creator of the Conflict tactics scale
Jon Strauss, former President of Harvey Mudd College
Robert P. Strauss, Professor of Economics and Public Policy, Carnegie Mellon University
Philip Taft, former Professor of Economics at Brown University
Sol Tax, former Professor of Anthropology, University of Chicago
Henry Charles Taylor, former Professor of Economics at Northwestern University and the University of Wisconsin-Madison
Lily Ross Taylor, former Professor of Classics, University of California, Berkeley and Institute for Advanced Study
Paul Schuster Taylor, former Professor of Economics, University of California, Berkeley
Larry Temkin, Professor of Philosophy, Princeton University (starting in 2011)
Albert M. Ten Eyck, agriculturist and agronomist
Earle M. Terry, physicist
Victor A. Tiedjens, agricultural scientist at Rutgers University
Virginia Tilley, Chief Research Specialist, Human Sciences Research Council (South Africa)
Ignacio Tinoco, Jr., Professor of Chemistry, University of California, Berkeley
Steve Tittle, Associate Professor of Composition and Theory, Dalhousie University
Andrew P. Torrence (M.A. 1951; Ph.D. 1954), President of Tennessee State University (1968-1974); executive vice president and provost of Tuskegee University (1974-1980).
Sidney Dean Townley, former Professor of Astronomy, Stanford University
Paul M. Treichel, chemist
Glenn Thomas Trewartha, geographer
Susan Traverso, President of Thiel College, former Provost of Elizabethtown College
Konrad Tuchscherer, Associate Professor of History and Director of Africana Studies at St. John's University
David Tulloch, Associate Professor of Landscape Architecture, Rutgers University
Melvin Tumin, former Professor of Sociology, Princeton University
Frederick Jackson Turner (1884, MA 1888), historian and professor, Pulitzer Prize winner
Joseph Tussman, former Professor of Philosophy, University of California, Berkeley
Michael Uebel, professor, author
Ruth Hill Useem, former Professor of Sociology, Michigan State University
Edwin Vedejs, former professor of chemistry at University of Wisconsin-Madison and University of Michigan
Victor Vacquier, former Professor of Geophysics, Scripps Institute of Oceanography, University of California, San Diego
Bonita H. Valien, PhD, former professor of Sociology at Fisk University, author of books about school desegregation.
Preston Valien, PhD, former professor of Sociology at Fisk University and Brooklyn College; cultural attache in Nigeria.
Robert van de Geijn, Professor of Computer Science, University of Texas-Austin
Andrew H. Van de Ven, Professor of Organizational Innovation, University of Minnesota
Charles Van Hise, former President, University of Wisconsin-Madison
Martha Vicinus, Professor of Women's Studies, University of Michigan
Julia Grace Wales, former Professor of English, University of Wisconsin-Madison; taught at the University of Cambridge and the University of London
Cody Walker, Lecturer in English, University of Michigan
John Charles Walker, plant pathologist
Hubert Stanley Wall, former mathematician at Northwestern University and the University of Texas-Austin 
Martin Walt, Professor of Electrical Engineering, Stanford University
David Der-wei Wang, Professor of East Asian Languages, Harvard University
David Ward, former President, American Council on Education
Arthur Waskow, former Resident Fellow, Institute for Policy Studies
John Watrous, Associate Professor of Computer Science, David R. Cheriton School of Computer Science at the University of Waterloo
Oliver Patterson Watts, chemical engineer
John Carrier Weaver, former Professor of Geography; former Vice President for Academic Affairs, Ohio State University; former President, University of Wisconsin System 
Warren Weaver, mathematician, Rockefeller Institute
Lee-Jen Wei, Professor of Biostatistics, Harvard University
I. Bernard Weinstein, former Professor of Medicine, Columbia University
Herman B Wells, former President, Indiana University
Norman Wengert, political scientist and professor
Peter Wenz, Professor of Philosophy, University of Illinois at Springfield
Mark Wessel, former Dean, Carnegie Mellon University
Wyatt C. Whitley, Professor of Chemistry, Georgia Institute of Technology
John Wilce, former Professor of Medicine, Ohio State University
John D. Wiley, former Chancellor, University of Wisconsin-Madison
Dallas Willard, former Professor of Philosophy, University of Southern California
T. Harry Williams, historian
William Appleman Williams, historian of U.S. foreign relations
Greg Williamson, Lecturer in English, Johns Hopkins University
Linda S. Wilson, President Emerita, Radcliffe College; former Vice President, University of Michigan
Christopher Winship, Professor of Sociology, Harvard University
Edward Witten, Professor of Physics, Institute for Advanced Study
Lawrence S. Wittner, Professor of History, University at Albany, SUNY
Julian Wolpert, Professor Emeritus of Geography, Public Affairs, and Urban Planning, Princeton University
David Woodward, geographer
Joseph Wong, Vice President, International at University of Toronto
James Wright, 16th president of Dartmouth College
Yang Guanghua, Chinese engineer
Y. Lawrence Yao, Professor of Mechanical Engineering, Columbia University
Stephen Yenser, Professor of English, UCLA
John Milton Yinger, Professor Emeritus of Sociology at Oberlin College
Allyn Abbott Young, former Professor of Economics, Harvard University and the University of London
Brigitte Young, Professor Emerita of Political Science, University of Münster
Hugh Edwin Young, former Chancellor, University of Wisconsin-Madison; former President, University of Wisconsin System
Nicholas S. Zeppos, Chancellor of Vanderbilt University
Valdis Zeps, former linguist
Zheng Xiaocang, Chinese academic administrator
Maung Zarni, Burmese educator, academic, and human rights activist noted for his opposition to the violence in Rakhine State and Rohingya genocide
Andrew Zimbalist, Professor of Economics, Smith College
Norton Zinder, Professor of Microbiology, Rockefeller University
Jane Zuengler, Professor of English; linguist

See also
List of University of Wisconsin–Madison people

References

Athletics
University of Wisconsin-Madison